The rulers of the Mughal Empire shared certain genealogical relations with the Mongol royals. As they emerged in a time when this distinction had become less common, the Mughals identification as such has stuck and they have become known as one of the last Mongol successor states. As descendants of Timur, they are also members of the Timurid dynasty, and therefore were connected to other royal families in the Mediterranean, Middle East, and Far East. So, the Mughal Empire has descended from the two most powerful dynasties.

Babur was also directly descended from Genghis Khan through his son Chagatai Khan.

See also
 Family tree of the Mongol Khans
 Timurid family tree
 Family tree of the Mughal Emperors
 Safavid dynasty family tree
 Turco-Mongol tradition

Notes
Columbia Encyclopedia, Sixth Edition, 2001–2005. "Tamerlane, c.1336–1405, Turkic conqueror, b. Kesh, near Samarkand. He is also called Timur Leng (Faisal R.). The son of a tribal leader, in 1370 Timur became an in-law of a direct descendant of Genghis Khan, when he destroyed the army of Husayn of Balkh. After the battle, he took Husayn of Balkh's widow, Saray Mulk-khanum (daughter of Qazan, the last Chaghatai Khan of Mawarannah, into his harem as his fourth wife. For the rest of his life he called himself Temür Gurgan - son-in-law- of the Great Khan Khan. Timur spent his early military career subduing his rivals in what is now Turkistan; by 1369 he controlled the entire area from his capital at Samarkand."

Tarikh-i-Rashidi: A History of the Moghuls of Central Asia. Elias and Denison Ross (ed. and trans.). 1898, reprinted 1972.

References

Muslim family trees
Family trees